Paul John Loughlin (born 28 July 1966) is an English former rugby league  who played for his hometown team St. Helens, the Bradford Bulls, the Huddersfield Giants and the Swinton Lions.

Loughlin was born in St. Helens, Lancashire, England. He made his first team début for St. Helens against Oldham aged 17 in 1984. He went on to score over 2,000 points for the club, and holds the club record for most points scored in a game - 2 tries and 16 goals for a total of 40 points in a 112–0 victory over Carlisle during September 1986. In 1995, he was transferred to the Bradford Bulls as part of the record breaking deal to bring Paul Newlove to Knowsley Road.

Loughlin was also a regular selection for Great Britain. He was selected to go on the 1988 Great Britain Lions tour.

Loughlin played right-, i.e. number 3, scored 2-tries and kicked 3 goals
, and was man of the match in St. Helens' 15-14 victory over Leeds Rhinos in the 1987–88 John Player Special Trophy Final during the 1987–88 season at Central Park, Wigan on Saturday 9 January 1988.

After his move to Bradford Bulls, he enjoyed several successful seasons with the Bradford Bulls. Loughlin then played a prominent role in the Bradford Bulls winning the Super League title in 1997. After spending two further seasons in the Super League with the  Huddersfield Giants, he ended his career with the Swinton Lions.

Loughlin appeared in a total of five Challenge Cup Finals, three times for St. Helens, and twice for the Bradford Bulls, and was a member of the losing side on each of these occasions.

Loughlin is now head coach of amateur rugby league team Garswood Stags ARLFC who have gained promotion to Northwest Men's League Division 4.

References

External links
!Great Britain Statistics at englandrl.co.uk (statistics currently missing due to not having appeared for both Great Britain, and England)
(archived by web.archive.org) Bull Masters - Paul Loughlin
Saints Heritage Society profile
 ĎŔƑ Meninga saves the day 
 Garswood Stags ARLFC

1966 births
Living people
Bradford Bulls players
English rugby league players
Great Britain national rugby league team players
Huddersfield Giants players
Lancashire rugby league team players
Rugby league centres
Rugby league fullbacks
Rugby league players from St Helens, Merseyside
St Helens R.F.C. players
Swinton Lions players